Guess Who's Coming to Dinner is a 1967 American romantic comedy-drama film produced and directed by Stanley Kramer, and written by William Rose. It stars Spencer Tracy (in his final role), Sidney Poitier, and Katharine Hepburn, and features Hepburn's niece Katharine Houghton.

The film was one of the few films of the time to depict an interracial marriage in a positive light, as interracial marriage historically had been illegal in many states of the United States. It was still illegal in 17 states, until June 12, 1967, six months before the film was released, and scenes were filmed just before anti-miscegenation laws were struck down by the Supreme Court in Loving v. Virginia.

The film was the ninth and final on-screen pairing of Tracy and Hepburn. Tracy was very ill during filming but insisted on continuing. Filming of his role was completed just 17 days before Tracy's death in June 1967. Hepburn never saw the completed film, saying that the memories it would evoke for her of Tracy were too emotional. The film was released in December 1967, six months after his death.

In 2017, on its 50th anniversary, the film was selected for preservation in the United States National Film Registry by the Library of Congress as being "culturally, historically, or aesthetically significant". The film's Oscar-nominated score was composed by Frank De Vol.

Plot
In 1967, Joanna Drayton, a 23-year-old white woman, returns from her Hawaiian vacation to her parents' home in San Francisco with Dr. John Prentice, a 37-year-old black widower. The couple became engaged after a 10-day whirlwind romance. Joanna's parents are Matt Drayton, a successful newspaper editor, and his wife, Christina, who owns an art gallery. Though both of the Draytons are liberal-minded, they are initially shocked their daughter is engaged to a man of a different race. Christina gradually accepts the situation, but Matt objects because of the likely unhappiness and seemingly insurmountable problems the couple will face in American culture.

Without telling Joanna, John tells the Draytons he will withdraw from the relationship unless both Draytons give the couple their blessing. To complicate matters, John is scheduled to fly to New York later that night, and then to Geneva, Switzerland for three months in his work with the World Health Organization. His answer from the Draytons, therefore, will determine whether Joanna will follow him. Tillie, the Draytons' black housekeeper, suspicious of John's motives and protective of Joanna, privately corners John and speaks her mind. To John's surprise, Joanna invites John's parents to fly up from Los Angeles to join them for dinner that evening. John has not told them his fiancée is white. Monsignor Ryan, Matt's golf buddy, arrives after Matt cancelled their game. He tells both Matt and the couple he is supportive of the engagement. But Matt will not yield. Christina tells Matt she, too, is supportive of Joanna, even if it means fighting Matt. Christina fires her bigoted art gallery manager, Hilary St. George, who nosily intrudes and voices her sympathy for Christina's situation. On the way to the airport to meet John's parents, the couple stops for a drink with an old friend of Joanna's and her husband; they are also completely supportive. 

John's parents, the Prentices, arrive. They, too, are shocked when discovering Joanna is white. At the Drayton home, various private conversations occur among the two families. All agree more time is needed to absorb the situation. The two mothers meet and agree this was an unexpected event, but support their children. The two fathers meet, both expressing disapproval at this unhappy occasion. The Monsignor advises John not to withdraw, despite Matt's objections. John's mother tells him she and Christina both approve. John and his father discuss their generational differences. John's mother tells Matt that he and her husband have forgotten what it was like to fall in love, and their failure to remember true romance has clouded their thinking. John chides Matt for not having the "guts" to tell him face to face he disapproved of the marriage. Finally, Matt reveals his decision about the engagement to the entire group. In his speech, Joanna learns for the first time that John made their marriage conditional on the Draytons' approval. Matt ultimately concludes, after having listened to John's mother, that he does remember what true romance is. He says although the pair face enormous problems ahead due to their racial differences, they must find a way to overcome them, and he will approve the marriage, knowing all along he had no right to stop it. The families and the Monsignor then adjourn to the dining room for dinner.

Cast

Influences
It has been suggested that a pair of contemporary cases of interracial marriage influenced Rose when he was writing the film's script.

Peggy Cripps, an aristocratic debutante whose father had been a British cabinet minister and whose grandfather had been leader of the House of Lords, married the African anti-colonialist Nana Joe Appiah. They would establish their home in the Nana's native Ghana, where he would subsequently hold office as a minister and ambassador.

At around the same time, Lloyd's underwriter Ruth Williams and her husband, African aristocrat Kgosi Seretse Khama, were engaged in a struggle of their own. Their union, which also occurred in the immediate aftermath of World War II, led to a storm of comment that snowballed into an international incident which saw them stripped of their chiefly titles in his homeland and exiled to Britain. They would ultimately return to the Kgosi's native Botswana as its inaugural president and first lady.

Production

 Produced and directed: Stanley Kramer
 Original screenplay: William Rose
 Associate producer: George Glass
 Music: Frank De Vol
 Director of photography: Sam Leavitt
 Film editor: Robert C. Jones
 Production designer: Robert Clatworthy
 Set decorator: Frank Tuttle
 Assistant director: Ray Gosnell
 Special effects: Geza Gaspar
 Process photography: Larry Butler
 Sound recording: Charles J. Rice, Robert Martin
 Costumes: Joe King
 Wardrobe supervisor: Jean Louis
 Song: "Glory of Love" by Billy Hill, sung by Jacqueline Fontaine

According to Kramer, he and Rose intentionally structured the film to debunk ethnic stereotypes. The young doctor, a typical role for the young Sidney Poitier, was created idealistically perfect, so that the only possible objections to his marrying Joanna would be his race, or the fact she had only known him for 10 days; the character has thus graduated from a top school, begun innovative medical initiatives in Africa, refused to have premarital sex with his fiancée despite her willingness, and leaves money in an open container on his future father-in-law's desk in payment for a long-distance phone call he has made. Kramer and Rose completed the film script in five weeks.

Kramer stated later that the principal actors believed so strongly in the premise that they agreed to act in the project even before seeing the script. Production had been set for January 1967 and ended on May 24, 1967. At age 67, Spencer Tracy was in poor health with heart disease, diabetes, high-blood pressure, respiratory disease, and other ailments. Aware of Tracy's failing health, insurance companies refused to cover him for the period of filming. Kramer and Hepburn put their salaries in escrow so that if he should die during the production, filming could be completed with another actor. According to Kramer, "You're never examined for insurance until a few weeks before a picture starts. [Even] with all his drinking and ailments, Tracy always qualified for insurance before, so nobody thought it would be a problem in this case. But it was. We couldn't get insurance for Spence. The situation looked desperate. So then we figured out a way of handling it. Kate and I put up our own salaries to compensate for the lack of an insurance company for Spence. And we were allowed to proceed."

The filming schedule was altered to accommodate Tracy's failing health. All of Tracy's scenes and shots were filmed between 9:00 am and noon of each day to give him adequate time to rest for the remainder of the day. For example, most of Tracy's dialogue scenes were filmed in such a way that during close-ups on other characters, a stand-in was substituted for him.

Tracy's failing health was more serious than most people working on the set were aware of. According to Poitier:
"The illness of Spencer dominated everything. I knew his health was very poor and many of the people who knew what the situation was didn't believe we'd finish the film, that is, that Tracy would be able to finish the film. Those of us who were close knew it was worse than they thought. Kate brought him to and from the set. She worked with him on his lines. She made sure with [Stanley] Kramer that his hours were right for what he could do, and what he couldn't do was different each day. There were days when he couldn't do anything. But also there were days when he was great, and I got the chance to know what it was like working with Tracy."

A bust of Tracy sculpted by Hepburn herself was used as a prop, on the bookshelf behind the desk where Sidney Poitier makes his phone call.

Tracy died two weeks after he completed his work on the film.

Hepburn significantly helped cast her niece, Katharine Houghton, for the role of Joey Drayton. Concerning this, Hepburn stated: "There was a lovely part for Kathy [Houghton], my niece [...] She would play Spencer's and my daughter. I loved that. She's beautiful and she definitely had a family resemblance. It was my idea."

According to Hepburn, the role of Joey Drayton was one of Houghton's first major roles as a young actress. "The part of my daughter," Kate said, "was a difficult one. A young unknown actress needs more opportunity to win the sympathy of the audience. Otherwise, too much has to depend on her youth, innocence, and beauty. She had one good speech to win the audience, but it was cut. Instead she only talks with her father about the differences between the principles he taught her and the way he's behaving."

Poitier frequently found himself starstruck, and as a result, a bit tongue-tied in the presence of Hepburn and Tracy, whom he considered to be "giants" as far as acting is concerned. However, Poitier reportedly found a way to overcome his nerves. "When I went to play a scene with Tracy and Hepburn, I couldn't remember a word. Finally, Stanley Kramer said to me, 'What are we going to do?' I said, 'Stanley, send those two people home. I will play the scene against two empty chairs. I don't want them here because I can't handle that kind of company.' He sent them home. I played the scene in close-up against two empty chairs as the dialogue coach read Mr. Tracy's and Miss Hepburn's lines from off camera."

Given the tense nature of racism in the United States during the time of the film's production, Poitier felt he was "under close observation" by both Tracy and Hepburn during their first dinner meetings prior to production. However, he managed to swiftly win them over. Due to Tracy and Hepburn's close history with Kramer, Poitier cited that Hepburn and Tracy came to bear on him "the kind of respect they had for Kramer, and they had to say to themselves (and I'm sure they did), this kid has to be pretty okay, because Stanley is nuts about working with him".

Release
The film premiered in theaters on December 12, 1967. The film falls into the genre of comedy drama. The film was released on VHS on December 12, 1987, on the 20th anniversary of the original release. The film was released on DVD on May 22, 2001. It was released on Blu-Ray on February 7, 2017, to commemorate the film's 50th anniversary.

Reception
Guess Who's Coming to Dinner was a box-office hit in 1968 throughout the United States, including in Southern states where it was traditionally assumed that few white filmgoers would want to see any film with black leads. The success of this film challenged that assumption in film marketing. Despite this success, which included numerous film award nominations, Frank Rich of The New York Times wrote in November 2008 that the film was frequently labeled as dated among liberals. Another main point of contention was the fact that Poitier's character, the golden future son-in-law, had no flaws and a résumé of good deeds. Many people felt that the dynamic between the Draytons and Poitier's character would have inevitably resulted in a happily-ever-after film ending because Poitier's character was so perfect, respectable, likable, and proper. Some people went as far as saying Prentice was "too white" not to be accepted by the Draytons. It was also criticized by some for these reasons at the time, with controversial African-American actor Stepin Fetchit saying that the film "did more to stop intermarriage than to help it."

The release of the film in the U.S. gave Poitier his third box-office success in six months in 1967, all of which placed the race of Poitier's character at issue. The film grossed a total of $56.7 million.

The film was first shown on U.S. television on CBS on September 19, 1971, and was the highest-rated film broadcast in the year with a rating of 26.8 and an audience share of 44%.

In a 1986 review of the film by The New York Times, Lawrence Van Gelder wrote: "the suspicion arises that were the film made today its makers would come to grips a good deal more bluntly with the problems of intermarriage. Still, this remains a deft comedy and – most of all – a paean to the power of love."

Variant versions
The original version of the film that played in theaters in 1968 contained a moment in which Tillie responds to the question "Guess who's coming to dinner now?" with the sarcastic one-liner: "The Reverend Martin Luther King?" After King's assassination on April 4, 1968, this line was removed from the film, so by August 1968, almost all theaters' showings of this film had this line omitted. As early as 1969, the line was restored to many but not all prints, and the line was preserved in the VHS and DVD versions of the film, as well.

Awards and honors

American Film Institute recognition
 AFI's 100 Years...100 Movies – #99
 AFI's 100 Years...100 Passions – #58
 AFI's 100 Years...100 Movie Quotes:
 "You think of yourself as a colored man. I think of myself as a man." – Nominated
 AFI's 100 Years...100 Cheers – #35
 AFI's 100 Years...100 Movies (10th Anniversary Edition) – Nominated

Remakes
Stanley Kramer produced and directed an unsold 30-minute television pilot for ABC-TV with the same title and premise in 1975.

In 2003, comedian Daniele Luttazzi published the screenplay Tabu, an almost verbatim parody of the film. In the variation, the engaged lovers are aged 40 (him) and 12 (her), and are brother and sister.

Episodes of The Golden Girls and The Fresh Prince of Bel-Air featured plots similar to the film.

The 2005 film Guess Who starring Ashton Kutcher and Bernie Mac is a loose remake, styled as a comedy rather than a drama, with the racial roles reversed: Black parents are caught off-guard when their daughter brings home the young white man she has chosen to marry. Talking about the film, Bernie Mac told USA Today in 2003: "Interracial dating is not that significant any more." Mac said of the script: "They want to make it a comedy, but I won't disrespect Spencer, Katharine or Sidney."

A British radio play entitled That Summer Of '67, written by actress Tracy-Ann Oberman and based on the story of the film's production, was broadcast on BBC Radio 4 on 31 December 2020.

A 2011 episode of the American sitcom Last Man Standing features an episode with a similar theme, although the couple is lesbian instead of mixed-race.

See also
 List of American films of 1967
 Get Out, a 2017 horror film with a vaguely similar premise
 You People, a 2023 romantic comedy focused on parental approval and interracial marriage

Notes

References

Further reading

External links

 
 
 
 
 

1967 films
1967 comedy-drama films
1967 romantic comedy films
1967 romantic drama films
1960s American films
1960s English-language films
1960s romantic comedy-drama films
African-American romantic comedy-drama films
American romantic comedy-drama films
Columbia Pictures films
Films about interracial romance
Films about racism
Films directed by Stanley Kramer
Films featuring a Best Actress Academy Award-winning performance
Films produced by Stanley Kramer
Films scored by Frank De Vol
Films set in San Francisco
Films shot in San Francisco
Films whose writer won the Best Original Screenplay Academy Award
United States National Film Registry films